Geir Knutsen (born 30 June 1959) is a Norwegian politician for the Labour Party.

He served as a deputy representative to the Norwegian Parliament from Finnmark during the term 2005–2009. In total he met during 3 days of parliamentary session.

On the local level he is a member of Båtsfjord municipality council, having served as mayor from 2003 to 2007 and again from 2011 to 2019.

References

1959 births
Living people
People from Båtsfjord
Labour Party (Norway) politicians
Deputy members of the Storting
Mayors of places in Finnmark